Judith-Flores Manuelevna Yalovaya (nee  Pisnyuk ; born June 9, 1987, Ryazan, RSFSR, USSR) is a Russian volleyball player.

Biography
Judith-Flores was born on June 9, 1987 in Ryazan. She studied at the Ryazan school number 65. Friends call her Zhu.

Her father is an Angolan, a paratrooper who studied at Ryazan Higher Airborne Command School. When the girl was one month old, he was drafted into the Angolan army due to the outbreak of hostilities in Angola. He died in 2009. Her mother is Russian, Elena Pisnyuk.

In the third grade enrolled in the volleyball section. Immediately fell in love with volleyball, never played other sports. As a rule, she played for older teams.

In 2004, at the age of seventeen, she was invited to the Tula club  , which, with her participation, went to the super league in one season. Having played one season in the elite, she spent a year on loan at the volleyball club  (Ulan-Ude).

For a long time, she combined the game in classic volleyball with beach volleyball, treating the latter as a hobby. Realizing at some point that she could not make a career in classic volleyball, she passed as a beach volleyball player.

In 2010 she moved to Obninsk.

In beach volleyball, she played in a pair with Galina Boyko, Anna Tishchenko, Olga Vyazovik, Natalia Stepanova, Ekaterina Birlova, Anastasia Vasina, Alexandra Shiryayeva.

In November 2015, she returned to classic volleyball in the League  B  as part of the volleyball club in Ryazan.

References

External links
 Judith-Flores  Yalovaya Profile at the Russian Volleyball Federation
 Judith-Flores  Yalovaya Profile at the FIVB
 Жудитт-Флорес ЯЛОВАЯ о волейболе: Это была любовь с первого взгляда // Komsomolskaya Pravda

1987 births
Russian beach volleyball players
Living people
Sportspeople from Ryazan
Russian women's volleyball players
Russian people of Angolan descent
20th-century Russian women
21st-century Russian women